Rainer Hartleb (born 29 February 1944 in Hildburghausen, Germany) is a German-Swedish director of documentary films. He is best known for the Jordbro suite, a series of films that follows a group of people from Jordbro from the age of seven, when they began school in 1972, until the present. , Hartleb has made six Jordbro films. En pizza i Jordbro (1994) won the Guldbagge Award for Best Film at the 30th Guldbagge Awards. On 13 January 2007 Hartleb won TV4's Guldsolen film prize for 2006.

Filmography
Jag bor på Hägerstensvägen (1970)
Från en barndomsvärld (1973)
Barnen från Jordbro (1982)
Hemligheten (1982)
Kärleken är allt (1986)
Tillbaka till Jordbro (1988)
Det var en gång... en liten flicka (1992)
En pizza i Jordbro (1994)
Wiedersehen in Hildburghausen (1996)
Nya barn i Jordbro (2001)
Alla mår bra (2006)
När jag blir stor (2009)

See also
Up Series

References

External links

Kunskapskanalen, May 2011: 5 x Hartleb. (In Swedish)

Swedish documentary filmmakers
1944 births
People from Hildburghausen
Living people
Producers who won the Best Film Guldbagge Award
Swedish film directors